The Bangladesh women's national field hockey team represents Bangladesh in women's international field hockey and is controlled by the Bangladesh Hockey Federation.

History 
Bangladesh Hockey Federation (BHF) was founded in 1972 while country’s first hockey stadium -- Maulana Bhasani Hockey Stadium was built in Dhaka in1987.

Bangladesh men’s hockey team started their journey in international hockey participating in the 1st Junior World Cup for Asia/Oceania zone qualifying round in Kuala Lumpur in 1977 while the recent-concluded Women’s Juniors (U-21) AHF Cup Hockey Qualifiers was the first international tournament for Bangladesh women’s hockey team.

Current squad 
Bangladesh Women's Hockey. 
 Sumi Akter(GK)
 Riya Akter Sharna(GK)
 Ritu Khanom
 Joariya Ferdous Joyita
 Mukta Khatun
 Rani Akter Riya Moni
 Parvin Akter
 Lima Khatun
 Fardia Akter Ratri
 Sanjida Akter Shathi
 Mokseda Munni
 Nadira
 Nanita Karmakar
 Sadia Khatun
 Tarin Akter Khushi
 Arpita Paul
 Tasmim Akter Mim

References

External links 

 Official website

Field hockey
Asian women's national field hockey teams
National team
Women's sport in Bangladesh